This is a list of vehicles designed or produced by GAZ, a Russian carmaker based in Nizhny Novgorod.

Current
 Minibuses and vans
 GAZelle NEXT
 GAZelle Business
 GAZ-3302 GAZelle mass production light 1.5t commercial truck with R4 engine (from 1994)
 GAZ-33023 GAZelle "Farmer" - light 1.3t commercial truck double cab (from 1996)
 GAZ-33027 GAZelle - 4x4 light 1.3t truck (from 1996)
 Sobol 4x4
 Sobol Business
Light-duty trucks
 GAZ-2310 ″Sobol″ - light commercial 1t pickup truck (from 1999)
 GAZ-A31 GAZelle NEXT - light 1.5t commercial truck (from 2013)
 GAZ-A32 GAZelle NEXT - light 1.3t commercial truck double cab (from 2015)
 Medium-duty trucks
 GAZon NEXT
 GAZ-C41 GAZon NEXT - 4x2 medium duty 5t truck (from 2015)
 GAZ-C42 GAZon NEXT City - 4x2 medium duty 5t truck (from 2016) - version with low frame

Past models

Trucks

 GAZ-AA - mass production 1.5t truck (1932–1938) license from Ford Model AA
 GAZ-4 - pickup truck (1933–1937) - 0.5t based on car GAZ-A license from Ford Model A
 GAZ-AAA - 6x4 2t truck (1934–1943) - three axle version of GAZ-AA
 GAZ-410 (also called GAZ-S1) - dump truck (1934–1947)
 GAZ-AAAA - 8-wheeled (8x4) car prototype (1936)
 GAZ-21 - prototype three axle (6x4) pickup truck (1938)
GAZ-М415 - pickup 0.5t truck (1937–1941) - based on car GAZ-M1
 GAZ-30 - prototype improved version of GAZ-AAA (1937)
GAZ-MM - truck (1938–1950) - mass production 1.5t improved GAZ-AA with 50HP engine M1-type, during 1942-1944 was conducted ersatz version MM-V, from 1947 was carried out on the plant UlZIS (from 1954 - UAZ)
 GAZ-51-11 - prototype truck (1939)
 GAZ-60 - truck tractor (1938-1943) - half-track version of GAZ-MM
 GAZ-62 - prototype 4x4 chassis (1939) - SWB version of GAZ-63 
 GAZ-63-11 - prototype 4x4 truck (1939-1943) - based on GAZ-51
 GAZ-42 - truck (1938–1950) - based on GAZ-MM but powered by wood gas
 GAZ-43 - truck (1938-1941) - based on GAZ-MM but powered by coal gas
 GAZ-44 - truck (1939) - based on GAZ-MM but powered by LPG
 GAZ-65 - truck (1940) - removable floor crawler gear version of GAZ-MM, limited special edition of the Winter War
 GAZ-11-415 - prototype pickup truck (1940) - based on car GAZ-11-73
 GAZ-61-415 - prototype 4x4 pickup truck (1941) - based on 4x4 car GAZ-61
 GAZ-33 - prototype truck (1941) - 6x6 version of GAZ-AAA
 GAZ-61-417 - 4x4 army soft-top cab pickup truck (1941) - based on 4x4 car GAZ-61
 GAZ-R1 - 4x4 field car - prototype for GAZ-64 (1941)
 GAZ-22 - prototype tractor based on T-40 tank with GAZ-MM cab (1941)
 GAZ-64 - 4x4 field car (1941–1943)
 GAZ-CX - prototype snowmobile truck (1942, 1945) - based on GAZ-MM
 GAZ-67-420 - prototype closed RWD version of GAZ-67 (1943)
 GAZ-63 - first prototype for GAZ-63 (1943)
 GAZ-67 - 4x4 field car - improved GAZ-64 (1943–1944)
 GAZ-67B - 4x4 field car - improved GAZ-67 (1944–1953)
 GAZ-68 - prototype self-propelled gun (1944) - based on GAZ-63
 GAZ-51 - mass production 2.5t truck - woody cab with carbureted R6 (GAZ-11) engine (1946–1955) 
 GAZ-68 - prototype truck to replace Lend-Lease Dodge WC truck, but cancelled in favor of the GAZ-63; ultimately led to the GAZ-62
 GAZ-51A - mass production 2.5t truck (1956–1975) - improved GAZ-51 with steel cab
 GAZ-63 truck - (1947–1955) - mass production 2t truck - 4x4 version of GAZ-51
 GAZ-63A truck - (1956–1968) - mass production 2t truck - 4x4 version of GAZ-51A
 GAZ-62 - prototype 4x4 army truck (1952)
 GAZ-69 - 4x4 pickup 0.5t truck (1953–1956), production moved to UAZ
 GAZ-69A - 4x4 field car (1954–1956), production moved to UAZ

 GAZ-M73 - prototype light pickup version of 4x4 car GAZ-M72 (1955)
 GAZ-56 (MkI) - prototype light 1.5t commercial truck with original steel cab & R4 engine (1956)
 GAZ-56 (MkII) - prototype light 1.5t commercial truck based on cab GAZ-52 & R4 engine(1959)
 GAZ-62 - 4x4 military airtransportation 1.2t cabover truck (1959–1962)
 GAZ-93A - dump 2t truck (1958–1975) - based on GAZ-51
 GAZ-52 - mass production 2.5t truck (1961–1991) with carbureted R6 (GAZ-51) engine
 GAZ-53F - 4x2 medium duty 3t truck with carbureted R6 (GAZ-51F, 82HP) engine (1961–1967)
 GAZ-53 - 4x2 medium duty 3.5t truck with carbureted V8 engine (1964-1965) - basic model
 GAZ-53A - 4x2 medium duty 4t truck with carbureted V8 engine (1965-1983) - improved GAZ-53
 GAZ-53-12 - 4x2 medium duty 4.5t truck with carbureted V8 engine (1983-1993) - improved GAZ-53A
 GAZ-33 - prototype 6x4 truck (1963) - based on GAZ-66
 GAZ-66/66-01 - mass production 4x4 cabover military 2t truck with carbureted V8 engine (1964–1996)
 GAZ-66-21 - 4x4 cabover civilian 3t truck (1993–1995) - agricultural version of GAZ-66-40
 GAZ-66-40/66-41 - 4x4 cabover military 2t truck with diesel engines (1992–1999)
 GAZ-3301 - prototype 4x4 cabover military 2.5t truck with diesel engine (1987) 
 GAZ-2304 ″Burlak″ pickup 0.7t (van) concept - based on car GAZ-31029 (1992)
 GAZ-2307 "Ataman" - 4x2 light 0.8 truck concept - based on cab GAZ-3307 (1995)
 GAZ-2308 "Ataman" - 4x4 light 0.7t truck concept - based on cab GAZ-3307 (1996)
 GAZ-2169 "Combat" - SUV concept (2000)
 GAZ-3120 "Combat" - SUV concept (2002)
 GAZ-2330 Tigr - 4x4 all terrain truck (from 2002)
 GAZ-2975 - Armoured Tigr
 GAZ-3306 - 4x2 medium duty 3t truck with diesel R4 (85HP) engines (1992-1995) - light duty version of GAZ-4301
 GAZ-3307 - 4x2 mass production medium duty 4.5t truck (1989-2010) - version with carbureted V8 engine
 GAZ-4301 - 4x2 medium duty 5t truck with diesel R6 (125HP) engine (1992-1995)
 GAZ-4509 - dump 4.5t truck (1992–1995) - based on GAZ-4301 
 GAZ-3308 "Sadko" - 4x4 military 2t truck (1997-2011) - 4x4 version of GAZ-3307 with the rear single wheels 
 GAZ-3310 "Valdai" - 4x2 medium duty 3.5-4t truck (2004-2015) - concept "Valdai" was shown in 1999

Passenger cars

 GAZ-A - 4-door phaeton car (1932–1936) under license Ford Model A (1929)
 GAZ-6 ″Pioneer″ - prototype closed sedan car (1934)
 GAZ-M1 - closed sedan car (1936–1943) - based on 1933 Ford B40
 GAZ-M25 - prototype 6x4 sedan (1938) - based on 6x4 pickup truck GAZ-M21
 GAZ-11-40 - prototype 4-door phaeton version of GAZ-11-73 (1940)
 GAZ-61-40 - 4x4 passenger car with 4-door phaeton body (1940), made only 5 copies
 GAZ-11-73 - closed sedan with 6-I (GAZ-11) engine (1940–1943, 1945–1946) - based on GAZ-M1
 GAZ-M1 V8 - NKVD V8 sedan with Ford V8 (1937–1941) - based on GAZ-M1
 GAZ-61-73 4x4 passenger car (1941–1945) - the world's first 4x4 sedan with a closed body
 GAZ-M20 - ″Pobeda″ passenger car (1946–1948, 1949–1955)
 GAZ-26 - prototype for GAZ-12 ZIM (1948)
 GAZ-12 - ″ZIM″ 6-I big sedan (1949-1959)
 GAZ-12A - ″ZIM″ Taxi (???)
 GAZ-12B - ″ZIM″ Ambulance (1950-1960)
 GAZ-M20V - improved ″Pobeda″ passenger car (1955–1958)  
 GAZ-М72 - ″Pobeda″ 4x4 passenger car (1955–1958)  
 GAZ-M73 - prototype pickup-truck version of GAZ-M72 (1955) - later produced as the Moskvitch 410
 GAZ-M20G - ″Pobeda″ I6 KGB car (1956–1958)
 GAZ-21 - ″Volga″ sedan (1956–1970)
 GAZ-18 - invalid car prototype (1959)
 GAZ-13 - ″Chayka″ luxury sedan (1959-1981)
 GAZ-13A - ″Chaika″ limousine (1960-1977), special edition
 GAZ-13B - ″Chaika″ 4-door phaeton car (1960-1977), special edition, made only 20 copies
 GAZ-22 - Volga station wagon (1962–1970)
 GAZ-23 - Volga V8 KGB sedan (1962–1971)
 GAZ-24 - Volga sedan (1968–1985)
 GAZ-24-01 - Volga sedan Taxi (1970–1985) from GAZ-24
 GAZ-24-07 - Volga sedan Taxi with LPG (1977–1985) from GAZ-24-01
 GAZ-24-02 - Volga station wagon (1972–1986) from GAZ-24
 GAZ-24-03 - Volga Ambulance wagon (1973–1986) from GAZ-24-02

 GAZ-24-04 - Volga station wagon Taxi (1973–1984) from GAZ-24-02
 GAZ-24-24 - Volga V8 KGB sedan (1971–1986) from GAZ-24
 GAZ-14 - ″Chaika″ luxury sedan (1977-1989)
 GAZ-14-05 - ″Chaika″ 4-door phaeton car (1982-1988), special edition, made only 15 copies
 GAZ-3102 - Volga sedan (1982–2010)
 GAZ-3101 - Volga V8 KGB luxury (escort, bodyguard) sedan (1984–1991) 
 GAZ-24-10 - Volga sedan (1985–1992) - improved GAZ-24
 GAZ-24-11 - Volga sedan Taxi (1985–1992) from GAZ-24-10
 GAZ-24-17 - Volga sedan Taxi with LPG (1985–1992) from GAZ-24-11
 GAZ-24-12 - Volga station wagon (1986-1993) from GAZ-24-10
 GAZ-24-13 - Volga Ambulance wagon (1986–1993) from GAZ-24-12
 GAZ-24-34 - Volga V8 KGB sedan (1986–1991) from GAZ-24-10
 GAZ-3105 - 4WD Volga luxury sedan (1992-1996) - all new platform to replace GAZ-14 Chayka
 GAZ-31029 - Volga sedan (1992–1997) - restyling GAZ-24-10
 GAZ-31022 - Volga station wagon (1993-1998) from GAZ-31029
 GAZ-31023 - Volga Ambulance wagon (1993-1998) from GAZ-31022
 GAZ-3103 - prototype front-wheel-drive version of GAZ-3104 (1998) - all new platform to replace GAZ-3110
 GAZ-3104 - prototype 4WD version of GAZ-3103 (1998) - all new platform to replace GAZ-3102
 GAZ-3110 - Volga sedan (1997–2004) - restyling GAZ-31029
 GAZ-3111 - Volga sedan (1998-2002, 2004)
 GAZ-310221 - Volga station wagon (1998-2008) from GAZ-3110
 GAZ-310231 - Volga Ambulance wagon (1998-2008) from GAZ-310221
 GAZ-3111 - RWD Volga luxury sedan (2001–2004) 
 GAZ-31105 - Volga sedan (2004-2009) - restyling GAZ-3110
 GAZ-311055 - Volga LWB sedan (2005-2007) from GAZ-31105
 Volga Siber - mid-class sedan based on Chrysler Sebring platform (2008–2010)

Full-size luxury cars
 GAZ-12 ZIM - big sedan (1950–1960)
 GAZ-13 Chaika - limousine (1959–1981)
 GAZ-14 Chaika - limousine (1977–1988)

Panel van
 GAZ-19 - prototype van (1955) - based on GAZ-69
 GAZ-2705 - GAZelle cargo van (from 1995)
 GAZ-2752 - Sobol cargo van (from 1998)

Halftracks
 GAZ-TK halftrack (1933–1934) - based on GAZ-A
 GAZ-VM prototype halftrack - based on GAZ-M1
 GAZ-60 halftrack (1938–1946)
 GAZ-65 halftrack (1940) - based on GAZ-MM
 GAZ-47 - off-road vehicle (1954–1967)

Buses
 GAZ-03-30 bus (1933–1941, 1945-1950) - based on GAZ-AA
 GAZ-05-193 staff bus (1936–1945) - based on GAZ-AAA
 GAZ-55 ambulance (1938–1950) - based on GAZ-AA
 GAZ-71V prototype bus (1949)
 GZA-651 bus (1949) - based on GAZ-63, production moved to PAZ
 GZA-653 bus (1950)
 GAZ-3221 - GAZelle passenger van (from 1996)
 GAZ-22171 - Sobol passenger van (from 1998)
 GAZ-2217 - Barguzin passenger van (from 1999)

Armoured cars
 BA-3 armored car (1933–1935)
 BA-6 medium armoured car (1936–1938)
 BA-10 middle armoured car (1939–1941) - based on GAZ-AAA
 LB-62 prototype armored car (1942) - based on GAZ-62
 BA-64 light armoured car (1942–1943)
 BA-64B light armoured car (1943–1946)
 BA-64Z prototype light armored snowmobile (1943)
 GAZ-40 - BTR-40 armoured personnel carrier (1950–1960)
 GAZ-49 - BTR-60 armored personnel carrier (1960–1976)
 GAZ-4905 - BTR-70 armored personnel carrier (1976–1986)
 GAZ-5903 - BTR-80 armored personnel carrier (from 1986)
 VPK-3927 Volk - tactical high-mobility multipurpose military armored vehicle
 GАZ-3934 "Siam" - armored police vehicle
 GAZ-5923 - Rostok (BTR-90) armored personnel carrier (from 2004 until 2010)
 VPK-7829 - Bumerang (VPK) armored personnel carrier (from 2011)

Tanks
 T-60 light tank (1941–1942)
 T-70 light tank (1942–1943)

Amphibians
 GAZ-011 amphibian prototype (1949)
 GAZ-48 amphibian prototype (1952)
 GAZ-46 MAV - light 4x4 amphibian (1952-??)
 GAZ-3937 - Vodnik amphibious 4x4 amphibian (from 1997)

Hovercraft
 GAZ-16 - prototype hovercraft (1962)

GAZ
GAZ